There were several noteworthy general strikes in 1919:

Seattle General Strike of 1919 in Seattle
General Strike of 1919 in Spain
Winnipeg General Strike of 1919 in Winnipeg